Donato Piazza (2 January 1930 – 14 September 1997) was an Italian racing cyclist. He won stage 22 of the 1956 Giro d'Italia.

References

External links
 

1930 births
1997 deaths
Italian male cyclists
Italian Giro d'Italia stage winners
Place of birth missing
Cyclists from the Province of Monza e Brianza